The following is a list of licensed banks currently trading in the British overseas territory of Gibraltar:

Turicum Private Bank Limited
Bank Jacob Safra (Gibraltar).
EFG Bank (Gibraltar)
Gibraltar International Bank
Gibraltar Savings Bank
Trusted Novus Bank Gibraltar 
IDT Financial Services Limited
Leeds Building Society
Lombard Odier Darier Hentsch Private Bank Limited
The Royal Bank of Scotland International trading as NatWest International
SG Hambros Bank (Gibraltar) Limited
Xapo

Banks no longer established in Gibraltar
 Banco Galliano
 Gibraltar Trust Bank - est. 1987 as a joint venture with Credit Suisse. In 1991 Credit Suisse wholly acquired Gibraltar Trust, which is now Credit Suisse (Gibraltar)
Barclays Bank PLC; The Anglo-Egyptian Bank (later Barclays) opened a branch in Gibraltar in 1888, but has now closed.
 Lloyds, closed in late 2019.
Newcastle Building Society, now closed 
Norwich & Peterborough Building Society, has now closed
Credit Suisse (Gibraltar) Limited has now closed its operations

Between 1900 and 1940 there were also four small, family-owned banks:
Cuby Brothers
Benzecry (El Banquerito)
Rugeroni Brothers
Marrache and Sons

References

Economy of Gibraltar
Banks
Lists of companies of British Overseas Territories
Banks
Gibraltar

Gibraltar